Gerard Dagobert Hendrik Bosch van Drakestein (24 July 188720 March 1972) was a Dutch track cyclist who represented his country at three Summer Olympics (1908, 1924 and 1928). He was born in Mechelen, Belgium and died in The Hague, Netherlands.

After having won a bronze at the 1924 Summer Olympics in Paris (2000 m tandem), he won the silver medal four years later in the 1000 m individual time trial, aged 41.

See also
 List of Dutch Olympic cyclists

References

External links
 Dutch Olympic Committee 

1887 births
1972 deaths
Dutch male cyclists
Cyclists at the 1908 Summer Olympics
Cyclists at the 1924 Summer Olympics
Cyclists at the 1928 Summer Olympics
Jonkheers of the Netherlands
Olympic cyclists of the Netherlands
Olympic bronze medalists for the Netherlands
Olympic silver medalists for the Netherlands
Sportspeople from Mechelen
Cyclists from Antwerp Province
Dutch track cyclists
Olympic medalists in cycling
Medalists at the 1924 Summer Olympics
Medalists at the 1928 Summer Olympics
19th-century Dutch people
20th-century Dutch people